Vepris glandulosa is a species of plant in the family Rutaceae. It is endemic to Kenya.  It is threatened by habitat loss.

References

gland
Endemic flora of Kenya
Endangered flora of Africa
Taxonomy articles created by Polbot